Palace Software was a British video game publisher and developer during the 1980s based in London, England. It was notable for the Barbarian and Cauldron series of games for 8-bit home computer platforms, in particular the ZX Spectrum, Amstrad CPC and Commodore 64. It caused some controversy with its advertisements in computer magazines, particularly for Barbarian II: The Dungeon of Drax which featured Page Three girl Maria Whittaker as a scantily-clad female warrior.

Palace's developers included artist Steve Brown and musician Richard Joseph.

In 1991, Palace Software's parent company, Palace Group, sold it to Titus France.

Notable releases
The Evil Dead (1984)
Cauldron (video game) (1985)
Cauldron II: The Pumpkin Strikes Back (1986)
The Sacred Armour of Antiriad (1986)
Barbarian: The Ultimate Warrior (1987)
Stifflip & Co. (1987)
Barbarian II: The Dungeon of Drax (1988)
Dragon's Breath (1990)

References

External links
Article on Palace Software – From CRASH  magazine
Palace Software profile from MobyGames

Defunct video game companies of the United Kingdom
Video game publishers
Video game companies established in 1984
Video game companies disestablished in 1991
Video game development companies
Defunct companies based in London